Auguste Jean-Baptiste Defauconpret (1767, Lille1843) was a French man of letters.

Initially a lawyer, Defauconpret relocated to England where he wrote some now forgotten novels. However, he became well known for his translations into French of English-language novels, particularly those of Walter Scott and James Fenimore Cooper, although he modified the text of The Last of the Mohicans to be more favorable to the French.

References
1951 paper on Fenimore Cooper by Willard Thorp

External links 

 
 

1767 births
1843 deaths
Musicians from Lille
18th-century French novelists
19th-century French novelists
French male essayists
French male novelists
19th-century French male writers
18th-century essayists
19th-century French essayists
18th-century French male writers